The 2006 term of the Supreme Court of the United States began October 2, 2006, and concluded September 30, 2007. The table illustrates which opinion was filed by each justice in each case and which justices joined each opinion.

Table key

2006 term opinions

2006 term membership and statistics
This was the second term of Chief Justice Roberts' tenure and the first full term with the same membership; Justice Alito joined the Court during the 2005 term.

Membership, opinions delivered, and frequency in majority

Justice-to-justice concordance

Notes

References

 

Lists of United States Supreme Court opinions by term